"The Sweetest Taboo" is a song by English band Sade from their second studio album, Promise (1985). It was released on 12 October 1985 as the album's lead single. While the song peaked at number 31 on the UK Singles Chart, it fared considerably better in the United States, where it reached number five on the Billboard Hot 100 in March 1986, remaining in the top 40 for 13 weeks. It also became the band's second consecutive number-one single on the Billboard Adult Contemporary chart, following "Smooth Operator".

Reception
Tanya Rena Jefferson of AXS stated, "The group allows the song to shine with its mellow and uptempo flavor. Sade sings proudly and boldly about how she is given love which brings out the best in her. The quiet storm vibe allows one to stand and groove dance to the soulful peaceful sound of the song."

Track listings
7-inch single (UK and Portugal)
A. "The Sweetest Taboo" – 4:25
B. "You're Not the Man" – 5:20

7-inch single (US, Canada, Australia, New Zealand and select European countries)
A. "The Sweetest Taboo" – 4:24
B. "You're Not the Man" – 5:09

12-inch single (UK, Australia and Japan)
A. "The Sweetest Taboo" (extended version) – 5:30
B. "You're Not the Man" – 5:20

12-inch single (select European countries)
A. "The Sweetest Taboo" (extended version) – 5:27
B. "You're Not the Man" – 5:09

Charts

Weekly charts

Year-end charts

See also
 List of number-one adult contemporary singles of 1986 (U.S.)

References

1985 songs
1985 singles
Epic Records singles
Portrait Records singles
Sade (band) songs
Songs written by Sade (singer)